The 1989 Arab Cup Winners' Cup is the first edition of the Arab Cup Winners' Cup held in Jeddah, Saudi Arabia between 20 Sep – 1 Oct 1989. The teams represented Arab nations from Africa and Asia.
Stade Tunisien of Tunisia won the final against Kuwait SC of Kuwait.

Group stage

Group 1

Group 2

Knock-out stage

Semi-finals

Third place match

Final

Winners

External links
1st Arab Cup Winners' Cup 1989 - rsssf.com
1st Arab Cup Winners' Cup 1989 - naseej.net

Arab Cup Winners' Cup
International club association football competitions hosted by Saudi Arabia
1989 in association football
1989 in Saudi Arabian sport